RML 16-inch 80-ton guns were large rifled muzzle-loading guns intended to give the largest British battleships parity with the large guns being mounted by Italian and French ships in the Mediterranean Sea in the 1870s.

Design and history

The gun was constructed of a toughened mild steel inner "A" tube surrounded by multiple wrought-iron coils, breech-piece and jacket. Rifling was of the "polygroove plain section" type, with 33 grooves increasing from 0 to 1 turn in 50 calibres (i.e. 1 turn in 800 inches) at the muzzle.

After a long design and experimentation period beginning in 1873,  with four guns became the only ship to mount them, in 1880. By that time such muzzle-loading guns were already obsolescent and were being superseded by a new generation of rifled breechloading guns.

Two more guns were mounted for coastal defence in the Admiralty Pier Turret at Dover.

Ammunition
This was a second-generation RML gun, equipped with polygroove rifling and firing only studless ammunition and using automatic gas-checks for rotation.

Surviving examples

The only two remaining example are in the ruins of the Admiralty Pier Turret, Dover, Kent, UK.

See also
List of naval guns

Notes and references

Bibliography
 Text Book of Gunnery, 1887 . London: Printed for His Majesty's Stationery Office, by Harrison and Sons, St. Martin's Lane
 Text Book of Gunnery, 1902 . London: Printed for His Majesty's Stationery Office, by Harrison and Sons, St. Martin's Lane
 Sir Thomas Brassey, The British Navy, Volume II. London: Longmans, Green and Co. 1882
N.J.M. Campbell, British Super-Heavy Guns

External links

 Flickr photos of the guns in the Dover turret :    
Photograph of Palliser projectile at Royal Marines Museum, Portsmouth, from Flickr

Naval guns of the United Kingdom
400 mm artillery
Victorian-era weapons of the United Kingdom
Coastal artillery